Tablas is the largest of the islands that comprise the province of Romblon in the Philippines. The name of the island was of Spanish origin. Before the colonization of the Philippines, Tablas was known as the Island of Osigan. At the time of contact with Westerners, Osigan had a population of two hundred and fifty people living in small villages. Wax was produced in this island.

Odiongan, on the west central coast of the island, is a major port and the largest municipality of Romblon in terms of population. Tablas is administratively subdivided into the municipalities of Alcantara, Calatrava, Ferrol, Looc, Odiongan, San Agustin, San Andres, Santa Fe, and Santa Maria.

Geography

A wooded central range of hills traverses the length of Tablas. The west coast is formed by the western slope of the central mountain ridge, which is narrow and well defined. The summits in the middle of the island are 1,600 to 2,000 feet high. The shore line is largely mangrove, with many beaches of coral sand and some limestone cliffs. The shore reef is continuous except off Guinauayan Point.

There is no good natural harbor except Looc Bay, a large indentation on the west side, but sheltered anchorage may be found on either side of the island, according to the season of the year.

Cabalian Point, the southern extremity of Tablas Island, is low and sandy and hard to distinguish at night, a lighthouse was built during the American Colonial period.

Education
Romblon State University is a premier institution for higher education in the Mimaropa Region. The University has a large campus in Odiongan town and a few more around Romblon province.

Economy
Main occupations are fruit and vegetable farming, fisheries, farm animal breeding and fishing. Tablas is one of largest producers of pili nuts.

Tablas was established an economic zone, Tablas Economic Zone Inc. (TEZI), on 2015 under the powers of the Philippine Economic Zone Authority (PEZA) and the Department of Trade and Industry (DTI)

Language
The Asi language is a Visayan language spoken, along with the Romblomanon and Onhan languages, in the province of Romblon, Philippines. Tagalog is spoken by the locals as the second language. Foreigners are a welcome diversion for college students, who are the main part of the population who can speak English.

Tourism

Due to insignificant commercialization Tablas has been little impacted by tourism and still offers a strong traditional Philippines cultural experience. Accommodations and resorts, though, are available around the island. there are a lot of resorts now, for example Binucot Beach Resort and Bar or Sunset Cove Resort, both located at Binucot Beach which means "hidden beach" in the Philippine language.

Attractions

Waterfalls
Mainit Falls, located about an hour hike north of Poctoy Port, is on a private property and not signposted, but is open to the public.
Dubduban-Bita Falls in Brgy.
Mablaran falls, located in Brgy. Linawan San Andres, Romblon at least 8 km from the town proper of San Andres, Romblon.

Lakes
Tinagong Dagat in Brgy. Both are deep and have cave-like formations under. One peculiar thing about Tinagong Dagat is that when it is high tide, Tinagong Dagat is in low tide and vice versa.

Beaches

Aglicay and Binay-we beaches in Alcantara
Atabay and Guin-awayan beaches in Ferrol
Binucot (Dolphin) Beach in Ferrol/Bunsoran
Puro Island, just off the coast of Santa Fe
Saptos beach in Mabini, San Andres is one of rarest of all because of shoe shaped rock formation. It has also white sand.

Wildlife
The Wildlife and landscape appears untouched as deep-green vegetation is crossed by rivers and streams. A portion of the native forest cover has been removed and converted to coconut plantations, or rough grazing. However, the remaining small areas of watershed forest support several species of endemic wildlife that occur only on Tablas, or on just Tablas and Romblon Island. These include the Tablas Fantail Rhipidura sauli, the Tablas Drongo Dicrurus menagei, the Romblon Hawk Owl Ninox spilonota, and the Tablas Bulbul Hypsipetes (siquijorensis) cinereiceps. The frogs Platymantis_lawtoni and Platymantis levigatus are endangered species endemic to Tablas and other islands of Romblon province. In Ferrol at Malcom's Cove, monkeys, sea turtles and the Philippine eagle. In Santa Fe the whale shark (the earth's largest fish) is known to breed. The waters off Looc teem with numerous species of tropical fish and sea life in the protected sanctuary. Binucot Beach has manatee, dolphin and sea turtles.

Scuba Diving
The diving on Tablas Island is world class and virtually unexplored. The water is a comfortable 26 Celsius and the visibility is generally +20m and as diving tourism is fairly new here crowds are non-existent; on any given day you may be the only person diving on the entire island. 
There are numerous walls around the island that go down to +60m and are covered in both soft and hard corals. Caves are commonly found along these walls as they are made of soft rock. Reefs around the island are extensive.

Access

By water
Access to Tablas is usually by ferry from the Port of Batangas City in southern Luzon and disembarking at the Port of Odiongan in Barangay Poctoy.

Montenegro Lines serves Odiongan from the Port of Batangas City six days per week with Roll-on/roll-off vessels, then heading to Romblon Island from Poctoy and returning the next day. Travel time from Batangas to Poctoy takes about 8–10 hours. Travel time from Poctoy Pier to Odiongan town is about 10 minutes by motorcycles. Tricycles are also readily available.

From Caticlan (Sambiray Dock or Tabon plaza) there is pump boats every day leaving around 10 - 11 heading for Santa fe. Leaves Santa fe at 7:30 in the morning. Travel time about 2h depending on sea condition.
there is also another pump boat (Boat name: SANOY, phone number to captain +639126356955) going from Tablas south tip (Tabugon) to Caticlan almost every day in the morning, leaves Tabugon around 8 in the morning and goes back from Caticlan (Sambiray Dock or Tabon Plaza) to Tablas around 10 - 11. 
Price for one way trip 200php. When low tide in Tablas there is a smaller boat (flat boat) sending passengers between the beach and the boat for 10php per passenger.

By air
The main commercial airport of the province of Romblon is Tugdan Airport (IATA: TBH – ICAO: RPVU) located in the southeastern coast of Tablas in Barangay Tugdan, in the town of Alcantara.

From Manila, Philippine Airlines (PAL) serves Tugdan three times a week. Beginning February 2017, Cebu Pacific started flying from Manila to Tablas four times weekly - Monday, Wednesday, Friday, and Sunday, using ATR 72-600 aircraft.

Images

References

External links
 

Geography of Romblon
Islands of Romblon
Populated places in Romblon
Tourist attractions in Romblon